Marion Township is one of the fourteen townships of Morgan County, Ohio, United States.  The 2000 census found 1,336 people in the township, 1,031 of whom lived in the unincorporated portions of the township.

Geography
Located in the southern part of the county, it borders the following townships:
Penn Township - north
Windsor Township - northeast
Wesley Township, Washington County - southeast
Bern Township, Athens County - south
Ames Township, Athens County - southwest corner
Homer Township - west
Union Township - northwest

The village of Chesterhill is located in central Marion Township.

Marion Township is the farthest south of all of Morgan County's townships.

Name and history
It is one of twelve Marion Townships statewide.

Government
The township is governed by a three-member board of trustees, who are elected in November of odd-numbered years to a four-year term beginning on the following January 1. Two are elected in the year after the presidential election and one is elected in the year before it. There is also an elected township fiscal officer, who serves a four-year term beginning on April 1 of the year after the election, which is held in November of the year before the presidential election. Vacancies in the fiscal officership or on the board of trustees are filled by the remaining trustees.

As of 2007, the trustees are John Metcalf, Gary Newton, and Charles Simmons, and the clerk is Stanley Starling.

References

External links
County website

Townships in Morgan County, Ohio
Townships in Ohio